Albert Stubbins (17 July 1919 – 28 December 2002) was an English footballer. He played in the position of centre forward, although his career was limited by the onset of World War II. While playing for Liverpool, he won the League Championship in 1947. He was later included on the front cover of The Beatles' Sgt. Pepper's Lonely Hearts Club Band album.

Life and playing career

Born in Wallsend, Tyne and Wear, England, he spent his early years in the United States, returning to Wallsend, where he attended Carville School, in 1929. Stubbins first played for Newcastle United in 1937, appearing in official games 30 times and scoring six goals for the team. In wartime games (classified as friendlies) he scored 188 goals in just 231 appearances.

In 1946 he was signed by Liverpool for a then club record of £12,500. Stubbins had also been approached by Liverpool's closest rivals, Everton, and he settled the decision with a toss of the coin. He made an immediate impact at the club: making his debut on 14 September 1946 in a league match at Burnden Park he scored an 82nd-minute goal as the Reds left it late to claim a 3–1 victory over Bolton Wanderers.

Following his move to Liverpool, Stubbins scored 28 goals (24 league goals) in the 1946–7 season (making him joint top scorer with Jack Balmer) helping Liverpool to win the League Championship, their first in 24 years. Stubbins also scored 24 goals the following season. Although a contractual dispute in the 1948–9 season limited his appearances for the Merseyside club, he then helped Liverpool reach the 1950 FA Cup Final, the first time Liverpool had appeared at Wembley. However, they lost to Arsenal by two goals to nil.

On 18 October 1950, at Blackpool's Bloomfield Road, Stubbins netted five goals in the Football League's 6–3 victory over the Irish League in an exhibition match.

Injuries forced him to retire in 1953, having scored 83 goals in 178 appearances, or 1 every 2.1 games. Despite his club success, he played for the England only once, in an unofficial international against Wales in 1945, a game England lost 1–0.

Following his retirement, Stubbins entered a full-time career in sports journalism, although he briefly coached an American semi-professional side, the New York Americans in 1960.

Stubbins later appeared on the front cover of The Beatles' Sgt. Pepper's Lonely Hearts Club Band album, the only footballer to be depicted. He also has a Liverpool FC fan club named in his honour. He also featured as a minor character in Stephen Baxter's time-travelling novel The Time Ships. He died in 2002, aged 83, after a short illness.

Career details

Wartime guest games (1939–1946) – 231 appearances, 188 goals
Liverpool FC (1946–1953) – 178 appearances, 83 goals, Football League First Division (Level 1) championship winners medal (1947), F.A Cup runners-up medal (1950)

Statistics

References

External links
Official Liverpool FC website profile
Player profile at LFChistory.net
Obituary in The Guardian

1919 births
Sportspeople from Wallsend
Footballers from Tyne and Wear
2002 deaths
English footballers
Association football forwards
Ashington A.F.C. players
Newcastle United F.C. players
Liverpool F.C. players
England wartime international footballers
British sportswriters
Sunderland A.F.C. wartime guest players
English Football League players
English Football League representative players
FA Cup Final players